Maurice John Byblow (June 23, 1946 – February 11, 2020) was a Canadian politician, who represented the electoral district of Faro in the Yukon Legislative Assembly from 1978 to 1985 and from 1989 to 1996.

Originally elected as an independent, Byblow joined the Yukon New Democratic Party caucus on September 16, 1981. He retired in 1985, and was succeeded by Jim McLachlan. He was re-elected to the legislature in the 1989 election, and served until 1992. He later served as an executive assistant to NDP leader Piers McDonald, and both were implicated in a conflict of interest allegation, although both McDonald and Byblow were eventually cleared.

After retiring from politics, Byblow purchased the Capital Hotel in downtown Whitehorse in 1997, and worked as a hotelier until selling the hotel in early 2008. Byblow died on February 11, 2020.

Electoral record

|-

| Independent
| Maurice Byblow
| style="text-align:right;"| 361
| style="text-align:right;"| 60.1%
| style="text-align:right;"| –
|-

| NDP
| Stuart McCall
| style="text-align:right;"| 231
| style="text-align:right;"| 38.9%
| style="text-align:right;"| –
|-
! style="text-align:left;" colspan="3"|Total
! align=right| 594
! align=right| 100.0%
! align=right| –

|-

| NDP
| Maurice Byblow
| style="text-align:right;"| 357
| style="text-align:right;"| 49.3%
| style="text-align:right;"| +10.4%
|-

|-

| Liberal
| Wayne Peace
| style="text-align:right;"| 160
| style="text-align:right;"| 22.1%
| style="text-align:right;"| +22.1%
|-
! style="text-align:left;" colspan="3"|Total
! align=right| 724
! align=right| 100.0%
! align=right| –
|}

|-

| NDP
| Maurice Byblow
| style="text-align:right;"| 194
| style="text-align:right;"| 42.8%
| style="text-align:right;"| +9.3%
|-

| Liberal
| Jim McLachlan
| style="text-align:right;"| 168
| style="text-align:right;"| 37.1%
| style="text-align:right;"| -2.2%
|-

|-
! style="text-align:left;" colspan="3"|Total
! align=right| 453
! align=right| 100.0%
! align=right| –
|}

References

1946 births
2020 deaths
People from Yorkton
Independent MLAs in Yukon
Yukon New Democratic Party MLAs